"Stranger Things" is a song by American rapper Joyner Lucas and American singer Chris Brown, released on February 25, 2018. 

The song was supposed to be the lead single from their upcoming collaborative mixtape Angels and Demons, but after releasing another single called "I Don't Die" and a promotional single called "Just Let Go", the project was never released.

Background and composition
On January 2, 2018, Brown posted a snippet of the song, saying that it was gonna feature Lucas and Ski Mask the Slump God. Later on that month Joyner Lucas revealed that he was recording music with Chris Brown on Twitter, then releasing the song in February. 

The song is named after the TV series Stranger Things, and its production is based on a sample of its theme. In the song the artists rap throughout the song, which does not feature choruses, but only verses where the two artists alternate themselves with various flow changes, and an outro where the two voices come together.

Music video
The videoclip for the song was shot on January 22, 2018, directed by Lucas himself together with Ben Proulx, and published on the day of the song's publication. In the music video the two artists are having a party in the back of a van in the streets of the suburbs of Los Angeles, until due to the excessive noise, two policemen arrive, but one of the two recognizes Brown, understands the situation, and decides not to do nothing, all interpreted in a comical way.

In the videoclip Brown wears his Heartbreak on a Full Moon chain, representing the album cover of his successful and acclaimed studio album released some months before "Stranger Things", depicting a bleeding heart over an "iced-out" moon.

Charts

Certifications

References

2018 singles
2018 songs
Joyner Lucas songs
Chris Brown songs
Songs written by Joyner Lucas
Songs written by Chris Brown
Gangsta rap songs
Atlantic Records singles